The 2021–22 Miami RedHawks men's ice hockey season was the 44th season of play for the program and the 9th season in the NCHC conference. The RedHawks represented Miami University and were coached by Chris Bergeron, in his 3rd season.

Season
Miami opened the season with a solid performance but then saw its offense stall for much of the next two months. The RedHawks earned a surprising win over Omaha in early November but that was one of the only bright spots during the first half of the season. While their conference schedule was a murders row of ranked teams, the team couldn't get on track with its non-conference schedule, losing games to Long Island and Ferris State, two of the weakest teams in Division I hockey.

Ludvig Persson received the bulk of minutes in the crease despite fairly pedestrian performance. Even so, he was ill-served by a porous defense that allowed an average of more than 35 shots against per game. As a result, Miami was one of the worst defensive teams in the country. Only St. Thomas, who were playing their first season at the D-I level, allowed more goals.

The team's poor play continued through January, leaving the team with just a single conference win in sixteen matches. After a week off at the beginning of February, however, the RedHawks were able to recharge and sweep a series against the Mavericks, winning consecutive games for the first time in over a year. Even while losing five of their next six to end the regular season, the team kept the score close on most nights and appeared to have found some level of fight.

The late-season improvement did not prevent the team from finishing last in the conference. Miami was set against Denver in the NCHC quarterfinals and, predictably, did not fare well versus the #3 team in the country.

Departures

Recruiting

Roster
As of September 28, 2021.

Standings

Schedule and results

|-
!colspan=12 style=";" | Regular Season

|-
!colspan=12 style=";" | 

|- align="center" bgcolor="#e0e0e0"
|colspan=12|Miami Lost Series 0–2

Scoring statistics

Goaltending statistics

Rankings

Note: USCHO did not release a poll in week 24.

References

2021-22
Miami RedHawks
Miami RedHawks
Miami RedHawks
Miami RedHawks